Wainui railway station was a flag station between Paekakariki and Paraparaumu on the Wellington-Manawatu Line in New Zealand, when the line was run by the Wellington and Manawatu Railway Company. This line is now part of the Kapiti section of the North Island Main Trunk.

The station was opened on 1 December 1886 and closed on 3 February 1902. It served the rural area between Paekakariki and Paraparaumu.

The platform was on the west side of the line according to Cassells, who shows a blind siding on the east side of the line with the south end joining the main line.

Hoy however says the station had no buildings or sidings, and was closed in 1900. He says it was north of McKay's Crossing near where a side road crosses the line and went into the hills. The station apparently served a local Māori community, and closed when the community moved into Paekakariki.

A contemporary newspaper report states that the station was closed late in 1895.

References 

Cassells, K.R. Uncommon Carrier: The History of the Wellington and Manawatu Railway Company, 1882–1908 p. 152 (Wellington, NZRLS, 1994) 
Hoy, Douglas. West of the Tararuas: An Illustrated History of the Wellington and Manawatu Railway Company pp. 53, 119 (Wellington, Southern Press, 1972)

Rail transport in Wellington
Defunct railway stations in New Zealand
Railway stations opened in 1886
Railway stations closed in 1902
Buildings and structures in the Kapiti Coast District